Baile de Máscaras is the fourth album recorded by Mexican rock band Maldita Vecindad y los Hijos del Quinto Patio. The LP was released on May 7, 1996 under the BMG label.

Track listing
 "Viva mi desgracia (Organillero)"
 "El Chulo"
 "Por ahí"
 "Vuelta tras vuelta"
 "No les creo nada"
 "El dedo"
 "Salta pa"trás"
 "Ojos negros"
 "Cenizas"
 "El Vigilante"
 "Aunque"
 "Don Palabras"
 "Vida vidrio"
 "Canción Omaha"
 "Lamento"

Personnel

 Roco - vocals
 Pato - bass
 Pacho -  drums
 Sax - saxophones

References

Maldita Vecindad albums
1996 albums